Antillophos elegans is a species of sea snail, a marine gastropod mollusc in the family Nassariidae, the true whelks and the like.

Description

Distribution

References

External links

Nassariidae
Gastropods described in 1866